"Never Give Up on a Good Thing" is a song by American R&B singer George Benson, released as a single in 1982. It entered the UK Singles Chart on 23 January 1982, and reached a peak position of number 14. It remained on the chart for 10 weeks.

The song was written by Michael Garvin and Tom Shapiro. It was issued on Warner Bros. Records and appears on The George Benson Collection,  released in 1981. The single's B-side is "Livin' Inside Your Love".

Personnel

Trombone: Bill Reichenbach Jr.
Trumpet: Chuck Findley
Flute, saxophone: Gary Herbig
Guitar, vocals: George Benson
Electric piano: Greg Phillinganes
Horn, trumpet: Jerry Hey
Drums: John Robinson
Piano, synthesizer: Michael Omartian
Bass guitar: Neil Stubenhaus
Percussion: Paulinho da Costa
Guitar: Steve Lukather

Charts

References

Link
 Lyrics

1982 singles
George Benson songs
Songs written by Tom Shapiro
Songs written by Michael Garvin
Warner Records singles
1981 songs